The 331st Bombardment Group is an inactive United States Air Force unit. It was last assigned to the 315th Bombardment Wing, being stationed at Northwest Field, Guam. It was inactivated on 15 April 1946.

During World War II, the unit was initially a B-17 Flying Fortress and B-24 Liberator operational training unit (OTU). Redesignated as a replacement training unit (RTU) in December 1943. Inactivated on 1 April 1944 when Second Air Force switched to B-29 Superfortress training. Late in the war the group was reactivated and trained as a Very Heavy (VH) B-29 Superfortress group The group served in the Pacific Ocean theater of World War II as part of Twentieth Air Force. The 331st Bomb Group's aircraft engaged in very heavy bombardment B-29 Superfortress operations against Japan.

History

Heavy bomber replacement training
The 331st Bombardment Group was first activated in July 1942 at Salt Lake City Army Air Base, Utah with the 461st, 462d, 463d and 464th Bombardment Squadrons assigned.  In September it moved to Casper Army Air Field, where it conducted Boeing B-17 Flying Fortress replacement training until 1943, when it converted to the Consolidated B-24 Liberator.  Replacement training units were oversized units which trained aircrews prior to their deployment to combat theaters. However, the Army Air Forces found that standard military units, based on relatively inflexible tables of organization, were not proving to be well adapted to the training mission.  Accordingly, it adopted a more functional system in which each base was organized into a separate numbered unit, while the groups and squadrons acting as replacement training units were disbanded or inactivated. This resulted in the 331st, along with other units at Casper, being inactivated in the spring of 1944 and being replaced by the 211th AAF Base Unit (Combat Crew Training Station, Heavy), which assumed the 331st Group's mission, personnel, and equipment.

Very heavy bomber operations
Redesignated 331st Bombardment Group (Very Heavy). Activated on 12 July 1944 at Dalhart AAFld, Texas. Assigned to Second Air Force. Trained for combat with B-29B's initially at Dalhart, then to McCook AAFld, Nebraska.

The 331st was assigned the B-29B model. This model was built at Bell-Atlanta. The B-29B was a limited production aircraft, built solely by Bell-Atlanta. It had all but the tail defensive armament removed, since experience had shown that by 1944 the only significant Japanese fighter attacks were coming from the rear. The tail gun was aimed and fired automatically by the new AN/APG-15B radar fire control system that detected the approaching enemy plane and made all the necessary calculations. The elimination of the turrets and the associated General Electric computerized gun system increased the top speed of the Superfortress to 364 mph at 25,000 feet and made the B-29B suitable for fast, unescorted hit-and-run bombing raids and photographic missions.

Moved to Northwest Field, Guam, April–June 1945, and assigned to the 315th Bomb Wing, Twentieth Air Force. Bombed Japanese-held Truk late in June 1945. Flew first mission against the Japanese home islands on 9 July 1945 and afterward operated principally against the enemy's petroleum industry on Honshū. Despite the hazards of bad weather, fighter attacks, and heavy flak, the 331st bombed the coal liquefaction plant at Ube, the Mitsubishi-Hayama petroleum complex at Kawasaki, and the oil refinery and storage facilities at Shimotsu, in July and August 1945, and received a Distinguished Unit Citation for the missions.

After the war the group dropped food and supplies to Allied prisoners of war in Japan. Inactivated on Guam on 15 April 1946.

Hurricane Ike (2008)
The unit was reactivated at Randolph AFB, Texas, in 2008 as the 331st Air Expeditionary Group, a special unit formed to support Hurricane Ike relief efforts. Units and personnel assigned to the 331st came from both the active and reserve components of the Air Force and Navy.

Lineage
 Constituted as the 331st Bombardment Group (Heavy) on 1 July 1942
 Activated on 6 July 1942
 Inactivated on 1 April 1944
 Redesignated 331st Bombardment Group, Very Heavy and activated on 12 July 1944
 Inactivated on 15 April 1946
 Converted to provisional status and allocated to Air Combat Command to activate or inactivate any time after 10 September 2008
 Redesignated 331st Air Expeditionary Group and activated 10 September 2008
 Inactivated on 16 September 2008

Assignments
 II Bomber Command, 6 July 1942
 Second Air Force, 6 October 1943 – 1 April 1944
 Attached to 17th Bombardment Operational Training Wing (Very Heavy), 12 July 1944 – 6 April 1945
 315th Bombardment Wing, 12 May 1945 – 15 April 1946
 Air Combat Command
 Attached to 1 AF-Air Forces North (AFNORTH), 10–16 September 2008

Components
 461st Bombardment Squadron, 6 July 1942 – 1 April 1944
 462d Bombardment Squadron, 6 July 1942 – 1 April 1944
 463d Bombardment Squadron, 6 July 1942 – 1 April 1944
 464th Bombardment Squadron, 6 July 1942 – 1 April 1944
 355th Bombardment Squadron 1944–1946 (B-29B)
 356th Bombardment Squadron 1944–1946 (B-29B)
 357th Bombardment Squadron 1944–1946 (B-29B)
 461st Bombardment Squadron 1942–1944 (B-29B)

Stations
 Salt Lake City Army Air Base, Utah 6 July 1942 – 15 September 1942
 Casper Army Air Field, Wyoming, 15 September 1942 – 1 April 1944, 6 July 1942 – 1 April 1944
 Dalhart Army Air Field, Texas, 12 July 1944 – 14 November 1944
 McCook Army Air Field, Nebraska, 14 November 1944 – 6 April 1945
 Northwest Field (Guam), Mariana Islands, 12 May 1945 – 15 April 1946
 Randolph Air Force Base, Texas, 10–16 September 2008

References

 Notes

Bibliography

 
 
 
 
 331st Air Expeditionary Group AFHRA Factsheet

External links
 331st Bombardment Group @ 315bw.org
 Airmen stand ready to provide hurricane relief at Randolph
 Expeditionary Group winds down Ike relief efforts

Air expeditionary groups of the United States Air Force